Stanegarth was built in 1910 as a steam-powered tugboat by Lytham Ship Builders Company for service with the British Waterways Board. She was converted to diesel power in 1957. The tug used to tow three dredging hoppers, each crewed by two men, on the trip to and from Gloucester to Purton.

On 6 June 2000 she was scuttled at Stoney Cove to produce an artificial reef suitable for wreck diving. A plaque attached to it reads "Stanegarth project by Stoney Cove and Diver Magazine June 2008".

See also

References

External links
Stoney Cove

Ships built in England
Tugboats of the United Kingdom
1910 ships
Shipwrecks of England
Ships sunk as dive sites
Maritime incidents in 2000
Wreck diving sites in the United Kingdom